Wernya thailandica is a moth in the family Drepanidae. It was described by Yoshimoto in 1987. It is found in Thailand, Vietnam and Yunnan, China.

Subspecies
Wernya thailandica thailandica (Thailand)
Wernya thailandica pallescens Laszlo, Ronkay & Ronkay, 2001 (Vietnam, China: Yunnan)

References

Moths described in 1987
Thyatirinae
Moths of Asia